The 1988 United States House of Representatives election in Wyoming was held on November 8, 1988. Dick Cheney  won his final term as Representative as he would resign in order to take the position of Secretary of Defense in George H. W. Bush's administration. Cheney defeated Bryan Sharratt with 66.62% of the vote.

Republican Primary

Results

References

Wyoming
1988
1988 Wyoming elections
Dick Cheney